Marni Abbott-Peter (born October 11, 1965) is a Canadian retired wheelchair basketball player. As a member of Team Canada, she won three gold medals and one bronze during the Paralympic Games as well as four World Championship titles. She was inducted into the Canadian Paralympic Committee Hall of Fame in 2015. She is married to fellow Paralympic athlete Richard Peter.

Early life
Born in Nelson, British Columbia, Abbott-Peter grew up in the Kootenays region of British Columbia, beside skier Nancy Greene Raine who inspired her to begin skiing. Although Raine would later move away, both Abbott-Peter and her brother partook in skiing lessons.

Career
Abbott-Peter sustained a spinal cord injury as a teenager while she was downhill skiing. As she was recovering, Abbott-Peter met Paralympic athlete Rick Hansen who introduced her to wheelchair sports. 

She first began swimming at the Pan American Games, where she won five medals, but soon began playing wheelchair basketball in 1988 and made the Canadian national team in 1992. From 1992 to 2004, Abbott-Peter won three gold medals at the Paralympic Games and three consecutive World Championship titles in wheelchair basketball with Team Canada. In 2003, Abbott-Peter was named Female Athlete of the Year by the BC Wheelchair Sports Association. After briefly retiring in 2004, where she served on the BC Games Society Board and coached, Abbott-Peter won a bronze medal with Team Canada at the 2010 World Championship. In 2007, Abbott-Peter was inducted into the BC Sports Hall of Fame. The following year, Abbott-Peter was inducted into the Wheelchair Basketball Canada Hall of Fame.

In 2012, Abbott-Peter was selected to coach at the Women's' Wheelchair Basketball tournament at the 2012 London Games. The following year, she was inducted into the Okanagan Sports Hall of Fame. In 2014, Abbott-Peter helped coach the BC Breakers to the Canadian Women's Wheelchair Basketball Championships at the 2015 Canada Winter Games. In 2015, Abbott-Peter was inducted into the Canadian Paralympic Committee Hall of Fame and later into the Basketball BC Hall of Fame. Outside of sports, Abbott-Peter was named into the Canadian Disability Hall of Fame in 2016.

Personal life
Abbott-Peter became engaged to fellow Paralympic athlete Richard Peter in 2005, and the two later married.

Paralympic Games results

References

External links 
 
 

1965 births
Living people
Canadian women's wheelchair basketball players
Canadian Disability Hall of Fame
Paralympic gold medalists for Canada
Paralympic bronze medalists for Canada
Sportspeople from British Columbia
People with paraplegia
Basketball people from British Columbia
Paralympic medalists in wheelchair basketball
Medalists at the 1992 Summer Paralympics
Medalists at the 1996 Summer Paralympics
Medalists at the 2000 Summer Paralympics
Medalists at the 2004 Summer Paralympics
Wheelchair basketball players at the 1992 Summer Paralympics
Wheelchair basketball players at the 1996 Summer Paralympics
Wheelchair basketball players at the 2000 Summer Paralympics
Wheelchair basketball players at the 2004 Summer Paralympics
Paralympic wheelchair basketball players of Canada